Associazione Calcio Femminile Prato, known as Prato Wonder for sponsorship reasons, was a professional women's football team from Prato in Tuscany, Italy. Founded in 1980, the club entered Serie A in 1985 after winning two consecutive promotions.

The club was thrown out of the league in November 1990 after failing to fulfil the first four fixtures of the 1990–91 Serie A season.

One of the team's coaches was former Pistoiese player Paolo Bessi.

Former players

References

Football clubs in Tuscany
Women's football clubs in Italy
Association football clubs established in 1980
1980 establishments in Italy
1990 disestablishments in Italy
ACF Prato